Drew Yates (born May 14, 1988, in Severna Park, Maryland) is an American soccer player who currently plays for Stumptown Athletic in the National Independent Soccer Association.

Career

College and amateur
Yates attended Archbishop Curley High School and DeMatha High School, played club soccer for the two-time national champion Casa Mia's Bays, and later attended the U.S. Soccer Residency Program in Bradenton, Florida. He was named the Washington Post Player of the Year and the Maryland Gatorade Player of the Year in 2006 and was a three-time NSCAA All-American.

He played four years of college soccer at the University of Maryland, and helped them to the NCAA Division I title in 2008. He ended his career at Maryland scoring 14 goals and having 13 assists, totaling 47 points for the squad, and received numerous honors, including ACC All-Academic, Second Team All-Atlantic South Region and Second Team All-ACC selections.

Professional
Yates was drafted in the second round (29th overall) of the 2010 MLS SuperDraft by Chicago Fire but was not offered a contract by the team. After a brief trial with Major League Soccer's D.C. United, Yates turned professional in 2010 when he signed for FC Tampa Bay in the USSF Division 2 Professional League. He made his professional debut on April 24, 2010, a game against the NSC Minnesota Stars.

He had a trial with Czech team SK Sigma Olomouc in January 2011.

Yates signed with USL Pro club Harrisburg City Islanders on April 13, 2011. Yates worked at Grace Christian School Bowie after his professional career ended.

References

External links
 FC Tampa Bay bio
 Maryland bio

1988 births
Living people
American soccer players
DeMatha Catholic High School alumni
Maryland Terrapins men's soccer players
Tampa Bay Rowdies players
Penn FC players
Charlotte Eagles players
Austin Aztex players
Stumptown AC players
Soccer players from Maryland
USSF Division 2 Professional League players
USL Championship players
National Independent Soccer Association players
United States men's youth international soccer players
Chicago Fire FC draft picks
People from Severna Park, Maryland
Association football forwards
Association football midfielders